The Archivo General de Indias, housed in the ancient merchants' exchange of Seville, Spain, the Casa Lonja de Mercaderes, is the repository of extremely valuable archival documents illustrating the history of the Spanish Empire in the Americas and Asia. The building itself, an unusually serene and Italianate example of Spanish Renaissance architecture, was designed by Juan de Herrera. This structure and its contents were registered in 1987 by UNESCO as a World Heritage Site together with the adjoining Seville Cathedral and the Alcázar of Seville.

Structure
The origin of the structure dates to 1572 when Philip II commissioned the building from Juan de Herrera, the architect of the Escorial to house the Consulado de mercaderes of Seville. Until then, the merchants of Seville had been in the habit of retreating to the cool recesses of the cathedral to transact business.

The building encloses a large central patio with ranges of two storeys, the windows set in slightly sunken panels between flat pilasters. Plain square tablets float in the space above each window. The building is surmounted by a balustrade, with rusticated obelisks standing at the corners. There is no sculptural decoration, only the discreetly contrasting tonalities of stone and stucco, and the light shadows cast by the slight relief of the pilasters against their piers, by the cornices, and by the cornice strips that cap each window.

The building was begun in 1584 by Juan de Mijares, using Herrera's plans, and was ready for occupation in 1598, according to an inscription on the north façade. Work on completing the structure proceeded through the 17th century, directed until 1629 by the archbishop Juan de Zumárraga and finished by Pedro Sanchez Falconete.

Researchers who wish to examine the archive's sources use another building located across the street.

Contents

In 1785, by decree of Charles III the archives of the Council of the Indies were to be housed here, in order to bring together under a single roof all the documentation regarding the overseas empire, which until that time had been dispersed among various archives, as Simancas, Cádiz and Seville. Responsibility for the project was delegated to  José de Gálvez y Gallardo, Secretary for the Indies, who depended on the historian Juan Bautista Muñoz for the plan's execution. Two basic motivations underlay the project; in addition to the lack of space in the Archivo General de Simancas, the central archive of the Spanish Crown, there was also the expectation, in the spirit of the Enlightenment, that Spanish historians would take up the history of Spain's colonial empire. It was decided that, for the time being, documents evolved after 1760 would remain with their primary institutions.

The first cartloads of the documents arrived in October 1785. Some restructuring of the Casa Lonja to accommodate the materials was required, and a grand marble staircase was added in 1787 after the designs of Lucas Cintara.

The archives are rich with autograph material from the first of the Conquistadores to the end of the 19th century. Here are Miguel de Cervantes' request for an official post, the Bull of Demarcation Inter caetera of Pope Alexander VI that divided the world between Spain and Portugal, the journal of Christopher Columbus, maps and plans of the colonial American cities, in addition to the ordinary archives that reveal the month-to-month workings of the whole vast colonial machinery, which have been mined by many historians in the last two centuries.

Today, the Archivo General de Indias houses some nine kilometers of shelving, in 43,000 volumes and some 80 million pages, which were produced by the colonial administration:

 Consejo de Indias, 16th–19th centuries 
 Casa de la Contratación, 16th–18th centuries
 Consulados de Sevilla y  Cádiz, 16th–19th centuries 
 Secretarías de Estado y Despacho Universal de Indias, de Estado, Gracia y Justicia, Hacienda y Guerra, 18th–19th centuries 
 Secretaría del Juzgado de Arribadas de Cádiz, 18th–19th centuries 
 Comisaría Interventora de la Hacienda Pública de Cádiz, Dirección General de la Renta de Correos, 18th–19th centuries 
 Sala de Ultramar del Tribunal de Cuentas, 19th century
 Real Compañía de la Habana, 18th–19th centuries

The structure underwent a thorough restoration in 2002–2004, without interrupting its function as a research library. , its 15 million pages are in the process of being digitized. The digitized sources are accessible online

References

External links
 website of the Archive
 virtual tour of the Archive 
 Monumentos de Sevilla: Archivo de Indias
 Fernando Bruner Prieto, "El Archivo General de Indias de Sevilla, Sagrario de la Hispanidad" 
 Interactive 360° panorama from Plaza del Triunfo with Cathedral, Alcázar and Archivo General de Indias (Java, highres, 0,9 MB)

Buildings and structures completed in 1598
Indias
Spanish colonization of the Americas
Buildings and structures in Seville
Renaissance architecture in Seville
Spain
World Heritage Sites in Spain
Mesoamerican studies
Latin American studies
History of North America
Tourist attractions in Seville
Libraries in Seville
Articles containing video clips